Balduin Baas (9 June 1922 – 22 May 2006) was a German actor. He appeared in more than 70 films and television shows between 1956 and 2002.

Partial filmography

 The Captain from Köpenick (1956) - Ostpreußischer Grenadier
  (1956) - Knecht Tiest
 Three Birch Trees on the Heath (1956) - Plaskude
 Die verpfuschte Hochzeitsnacht (1957) - Schaffner / Conductor
 Tired Theodore (1957) - Hoteldiener Anton
 The Man Who Couldn't Say No (1958)
 The Rest Is Silence (1959) - Sekretär Werner Osfried
  (1960) - Bambino
  (1961) - Karusellbetreiber (uncredited)
 Mörderspiel (1961) - Diener Arthur
 The Liar (1961) - Wiedemayer
 Genosse Münchhausen (1962) - Herr Biese
 Lausbubengeschichten (1964) - Privatlehrer
 DM-Killer (1965) - Parson Behrendt
 The Gentlemen (1965) - Meyberg
 Who Wants to Sleep? (1965)
 Die Liebesquelle (1966) - Druggist
 I Am Looking for a Man (1966) - Artist Pauli
 Once a Greek (1966) - Auguste
 Das Rasthaus der grausamen Puppen (1967) - Lupus McIntosh
 Zur Hölle mit den Paukern (1968) - Dr. Blaumeier
  (1968) - Lesender
 Zum Teufel mit der Penne (1968) - Studienrat Blaumeier
 Slap in the Face (1970) - Vize
 We'll Take Care of the Teachers (1970) - Oberstudienrat Blaumeier
 Twenty Girls and the Teachers (1971)
 Morgen fällt die Schule aus (1971) - Oberstudienrat Blaumeier
 Willi Manages the Whole Thing (1972) - Wolfgang Amadeus Wirsing
 Betragen ungenügend! (1972) - Blaumeier
 Hauptsache Ferien (1972) - Lehrer Brummer
 Wer einmal in das Posthorn stößt (1973) - Dr. Windgassen
 To the Bitter End (1975) - Fogosch
 Orchestra Rehearsal (1978) - Conductor
 The Magic Mountain (1982) - Zeichenlehrer
 Doctor Faustus (1982)
  (1983) - Dürkheimer
 Derrick (1984-1986, TV Series) - Frank
  (1990) - Kreuzer
 Pappa Ante Portas (1991) - Geburtstagsgesellschaft: Musiklehrer
 Candy (1998)

References

External links

1922 births
2006 deaths
German male film actors
German male television actors
Male actors from Gdańsk
20th-century German male actors
People from the Free City of Danzig